A brochure is a promotional document primarily used to introduce a company, organization, products, or services and inform prospective customers or members of the public of the benefits. Although, initially, a paper document that can be folded into a template, pamphlet, or leaflet, a brochure can also be a set of related unfolded papers put into a pocket folder or packet or can be in digital format.

A brochure is a corporate marketing instrument to promote a product or service. It is a tool used to circulate information about the product or service. A brochure is like a magazine but with pictures of the product or the service which the brand is promoting. Depending on various aspects there are different types of brochures: Gate Fold Brochures, Trifold Brochures, and Z-Fold Brochures.

Brochures are distributed in many ways: as newspaper inserts, handed out personally, by mail, or placed in brochure racks in high-traffic locations, especially in tourist precincts. They may be considered grey literature. A brochure is usually folded and only includes promotional summary information.

Description

A brochure is usually folded and only includes promotional summary information. A booklet is typically several sheets of paper with a card stock cover and bound with staples, string, or plastic binding. In contrast, a single piece of unfolded paper is usually called an insert, flyer, or bulletin.

Varieties

Brochures available in electronic format are called e-brochures. This format has the added benefit of unlimited distribution and cost savings compared to traditional paper brochures.

The most common types of single-sheet brochures are the bi-fold (a single sheet printed on both sides and folded into halves) and the tri-fold (the same, but folded into thirds). A bi-fold brochure results in four panels (two panels on each side), while a tri-fold results in six panels (three panels on each side).

Other brochure fold arrangements are possible: the accordion or "z-fold" method, the "c-fold" method, etc. Larger sheets, such as those with detailed maps or expansive photo spreads, are folded into four, five, or six panels. 

Booklet brochures are made of multiple sheets, most often saddle-stitched, stapled on the creased edge, or perfect bound like a paperback book, and result in eight or more panels.

Printing
Brochures are often printed using four-color process on thick, glossy paper to give an impression of quality. Businesses may print small quantities of brochures on a computer printer, or a digital printer, but offset printing turns out higher quantities at a lower cost per item.

Compared with a flyer, a brochure usually uses higher-quality paper, more color, and is folded.

Marketing brochure

The term "marketing brochure" refers to a small document, or pamphlet, which describes and promotes various products or services to be marketed. Some companies have developed computer printing software to generate marketing brochures,
which might be available for use at a public library. However, it is common for a company to have a marketing brochure prepared by a professional printing company (or department) that has experience in creating such documents. As compared to a flyer or a handbill, a printed brochure usually has higher-quality paper and more color and is folded or stapled at the seam.

Because the goal of a marketing brochure is typically to assist in the sales or distribution of products and services, the wording in the brochure is often very positive, with "glowing terms" to describe the features and benefits being offered. It is unlikely for a marketing brochure to list major complaints customers have stated about the products to avoid any negative aspects of those products or services. Instead, the focus is typically on persuasion to encourage people to obtain the items described in the brochure.

The term "marketing brochure" dates back many decades, such as for advertising new automobile features of the 1955 Ford Thunderbird.

See also

 Executive summary
 Propaganda

References

Advertising publications by format
Grey literature
Promotion and marketing communications